Krasimir Kolev (born 7 November 1971) is a former Bulgarian goalkeeper, who currently works as a goalkeepers coach for Cherno More Varna until 2012. 
now is a goalkeeper coach for LEVSKI Sofia Kolev previously played for Proodeftiki F.C. in the Greek Alpha Ethniki.

References

Bulgarian footballers
First Professional Football League (Bulgaria) players
Association football goalkeepers
PFC Levski Sofia players
PFC Lokomotiv Plovdiv players
PFC Spartak Varna players
PFC Cherno More Varna players
PFC Dobrudzha Dobrich players
Proodeftiki F.C. players
Living people
1971 births
People from Dobrich